The 2020 Milan Ciga Vasojević Cup is the 14th season of the Serbian women's national basketball cup tournament.,

The tournament was held in Surdulica from 14–15 March 2020.

Qualified teams

Venue

Bracket

Semifinals

Radivoj Korać vs Vrbas Medela

Kraljevo vs Novosadska ŽKA

Final

See also
2019–20 First Women's Basketball League of Serbia
2019–20 Radivoj Korać Cup

References

External links
 Official website 

Milan Ciga Vasojević Cup
Basketball
Serbia